Miss California is a 2006 Indian Kannada-language romantic drama film directed by Kodlu Ramakrishna and starring newcomers Jahnavi, Diganth, and Soumya. The film's storyline is based on C. N. Muktha's novel "Megha Mandara".

Cast 
Jahnavi as Janu
Diganth as Diganth
Soumya as Soumya
Sarath Babu as Prasad
Geetha as Shakuntala
Dattanna
Jayanthi
 Swastik Shankar

Production 
The film was shot in Bangalore, California and Tirthahalli. The film is produced by NRIs. Ths songs were shot in places such as the Golden Gate Bridge and Stanford University.

Reception 
R. G. Vijayasarathy of Rediff.com gave the film a rating of two-and-a-half out of five stars and wrote that "Despite the minor flaws though, Miss California is definitely above average". A critic from Nowrunning opined that "Miss California can be viewed for its rich locales and a good story, but you will get a feeling that the film lacks a strong script". A critic from Indiaglitz rated the film five out of ten and stated that "Visual beauty is not just enough. The good story, screenplay and dialogue are the requirement for an up to date film". On the contrary, a critic from Chitraloka wrote that "Based on C.N.Muktha's novel this film 'Miss California' is aptly made for the family viewing". A critic from webindia123 said that "the film has not turned out to be impressive mainly because of an incoherent script and inadequate direction by Kodlu Ramakrishna".

References